Rohinton Rustomji Noble (1926/1927 – 17 June 1975) was an Indian cyclist. He competed in the time trial and the team pursuit events at the 1948 Summer Olympics.

References

External links
 

1920s births
1975 deaths
Indian male cyclists
Olympic cyclists of India
Cyclists at the 1948 Summer Olympics
Asian Games medalists in cycling
Cyclists at the 1951 Asian Games
Medalists at the 1951 Asian Games
Asian Games bronze medalists for India
Parsi people